Ctenophorus tjantjalka, also known as the ochre dragon, is a species of agamid lizard occurring on low, weathered, crumbling outcrops and stony hills in arid South Australia, from the Painted Hills north-west to the base of the Everard Ranges.

References

tjantjalka
Agamid lizards of Australia
Endemic fauna of Australia
Reptiles described in 1992